Kanthi Dakshin Assembly constituency is an assembly constituency in Purba Medinipur district in the Indian state of West Bengal.

Overview
As per orders of the Delimitation Commission, No. 216 Kanthi Dakshin Assembly constituency is composed of the following: Contai municipality, Contai I community development block, and Durmuth and Kusumpur gram panchayats of Contai III community development block.

Kanthi Dakshin Assembly constituency is part of No. 31 Kanthi (Lok Sabha constituency).

Members of Legislative Assembly 

 ^ indicates bye-poll

Election results

2021

2017
The bye election was necessitated by the resignation of the sitting MLA, Dibyendu Adhikari, as he was elected as MP in the Indian Parliament from Tamluk Lok Sabha Constituency on 19 November 2016.

2016

2011

  

.# Swing calculated on Congress+Trinamool Congress vote percentages taken together in 2006. 2009 by election not taken into consideration because of lack of sufficient data.

2006

  

.# Swing calculated on BJP+Trinamool Congress vote percentages taken together in 2006. 2009 by election not taken into consideration because of lack of sufficient data.

1977-2006
In the by-election held in 2009, because of the election of the sitting MLA Suvendu Adhikari to parliament from Tamluk (Lok Sabha constituency), Dibyendu Adhikari of Trinamool Congress won the Contai South seat defeating Satyendra Nath Panda of CPI.

In the 2006 state assembly elections Suvendu Adhikari of Trinamool Congress won the Contai South assembly seat defeating his nearest rival Satyendra Nath Panda of CPI. Contests in most years were multi cornered but only winners and runners are being mentioned. Sisir Adhikari of Trinamool Congress defeated Sukhendu Maiti of CPI in 2001. Sailaja Kumar Das of Congress defeated Sukhendu Maity of CPI in 1996 and 1991. Sukhendu Maity of CPI defeated Sailaja Kumar Das of Congress in 1987. Sisir Adhikari of Congress defeated Deepak Mondal, Independent, in 1982. Satyabrata Maity of Janata Party defeated Sudhir Chandra Das, Independent, in 1977.

1951-1972
Sudhir Chandra Das of PSP won in 1972, 1971, 1969, 1967 and 1962. Rashbehari Pal of Congress won in 1957. In independent India's first election in 1951 Natendra Nath Das of KMPP won the Contai South seat.

References

Assembly constituencies of West Bengal
Politics of Purba Medinipur district